Laura Marcu is an American scientist and a professor of biomedical engineering and neurological surgery at the University of California, Davis. She is also a Fellow of numerous professional societies: the Biomedical Engineering Society, SPIE, The Optical Society and the National Academy of Inventors.

Career and research 
Professor Laura Marcu received her Diploma of Engineer in Mechanical Engineering from the Polytechnic Institute of Bucharest, Romania. She did a post-graduate specialization in Spectroscopy, Laser and Plasma Physics at the University of Bucharest, Romania. Marcu obtained her M.S and Ph.D. Diploma in Biomedical Engineering from the University of Southern California, Los Angeles.

Marcu's work focuses primarily on research for development of optical techniques for tissue diagnostics. Her laboratory has developed time-resolved fluorescence spectroscopy (TRFS) and fluorescence lifetime imaging microscopy (FLIM) systems for in vivo tissue interrogation, including human patients. Her laboratory has a broad expertise in clinical translation of biophotonic technologies that play an important role in addressing challenges associate with tissue diagnostics and therapies. Her group also studies the application of semiconductor quantum dots to early detection of pathologic transformations in tissues as well as the application of ultrashort electric fields to cancer therapy.

Marcu developed a catheter probe able to image arteries inside a living heart which could help cardiologists predict heart attacks more reliably.

Patents 

 Single catheter system that provides both intravascular ultrasound and fluorescence lifetime imaging
 Biochemical marker detection device
 Internal biochemical sensing device
 Method for intracellular modifications within living cells using pulsed electric fields
 Time-resolved and wavelength-resolved spectroscopy for characterizing biological materials

Awards and honors 
 Named a fellow by the National Academy of Inventors in 2017.
 Fellow of the Optical Society in 2014 for "the development and clinical translation of fluorescence lifetime spectroscopy and imaging techniques."
 Fellow of SPIE in 2012.
 Fellow of the Biomedical Engineering Society in 2011.
Senior Member of IEEE.

References

External links 
 Marcu on becoming interested in optics at osa.org

Year of birth missing (living people)
Living people
American biomedical engineers
University of California, Davis faculty
Fellows of Optica (society)
21st-century women engineers
21st-century American inventors
American women engineers
Fellows of the Biomedical Engineering Society
Fellows of SPIE
Women in optics
21st-century American women